Priory Records is a record company in the UK founded in 1980, and devoted mostly to church music and organ music.
Important projects have included the complete Psalms sung by cathedral choirs to Anglican chant, all of the Magnificat and Nunc dimittis settings by Herbert Howells, the "British Church Composer Series", the "Choral and Music from English Cathedrals", the "Music for Evensong" and, more recently, all the hymns in the complete New English Hymnal Series. There are also three discs of the Communion Service settings of Stanford and four further discs featuring settings of the Te Deum and Jubilate (by various composers).

The collection of CDs "Great European Organs" is dedicated to the discovery of European organs with the participation of the following organists: Kevin Bowyer, Daniel Roth, Nicolas Kynaston, Graham Barber, David Briggs, John Scott, Gerard Brooks, Jane Watts, Roger Sayer, Colin Walsh, Christopher Herrick, Stephen Farr, John Scott Whiteley, Stephen Cleobury, Stefan Engels, Daniel Cook, Marco Lo Muscio, Nicholas Jackson, Naji Hakim, Dame Gillian Weir, etc.

Other Organ collections include: the complete works by Olivier Messiaen performed by Dame Gillian Weir, "Great Australasian Organs", "Victorian Organ Sonatas", "Christmas Organ Music", "Organ Master Series", "Organ Concertos", "Concert Hall Series"; the "Complete Organ Works" by: Sigfrid Karg-Elert, Herbert Sumsion, Camille Saint-Saëns, Eugène Gigout, Hubert Parry, Percy Whitlock, Frank Bridge, Ralph Vaughan Williams, Joseph Jongen, Kenneth Leighton, Henri Mulet, William Mathias, Samuel Sebastian Wesley.
 
Neil Collier is the managing director of the company, and also produces and engineers recordings for the label. In 2018, he was made an honorary member of the Royal School of Church Music (HonRSCM).

References

External links
 Official site

British record labels
Record labels established in 1980